Mamarongo is a settlement in Riohacha Municipality, La Guajira Department in Colombia. It is located at the foothills of the Sierra Nevada de Santa Marta mountain range.

Climate
Mamarongo has a subtropical highland climate (Cfb) with moderate rainfall from December to March and heavy to very heavy rainfall from April to November.

References

Populated places in the Guajira Department